is a Japanese anime creator and producer, screenwriter, visual artist, and mecha designer. He is best known for creating the Macross mecha anime franchise and the Diaclone toyline, which were in turn the basis for the Robotech and Transformers franchises, respectively. He is also known for creating The Vision of Escaflowne anime series. He pioneered several innovative concepts in his works, such as transforming mecha (including the VF-1 Valkyrie in Macross and Optimus Prime in Transformers) and virtual idols (including Lynn Minmay and Sharon Apple in the Macross franchise). His work has had a significant impact on popular culture, both in Japan and internationally.

Personal life
Shoji Kawamori was born in Toyama, Japan in 1960. Later in his youth he attended Keio University in the late seventies and in the same years as Macross screenwriter Hiroshi Ōnogi and character designer Haruhiko Mikimoto, where they became friends and founded a Mobile Suit Gundam fan club called "Gunsight One", a name the group would use years later during the development of the fictional world of the Macross series.

Anime creation and production
Shoji Kawamori occasionally used the alias Eiji Kurokawa (黒河影次 Kurokawa Eiji) early in his anime career when he started as a teenage intern at Studio Nue and worked as assistant artist and animator there during the late seventies and early eighties. Later in his career Kawamori created or co-created the concepts which served as basis for several anime series such as Super Dimension Fortress Macross, The Vision of Escaflowne, Earth Maiden Arjuna, Genesis of Aquarion, Macross 7, Macross Frontier, and Macross Delta. His projects are usually noted to contain strong themes of love, war, spirituality or mysticism, and ecological concern. Kawamori is currently executive director at the animation studio Satelight.

Mecha design
Shoji Kawamori is also a visual artist and a mecha designer — projects featuring his designs range from 1983's Crusher Joe to 2005's Eureka Seven. Also, each and every variable fighter from the official Macross series continuity has been designed by him.

Kawamori also helped to design various toys for the Takara toyline Diaclone in the early 1980s, many of which were later incorporated into Hasbro's Transformers toyline. Quite a few of them became iconic Transformers: Generation 1 toy designs. Among them the first Optimus Prime ("Convoy") toy design, Prowl, Bluestreak, Smokescreen, Ironhide, and Ratchet. In 2006, he designed both the Hybrid Style Convoy and the Masterpiece version of Starscream for Takara.

One of his key mech design innovations was transforming mecha, which can transform between a standard vehicle (such as a fighter plane or transport truck) and a fighting mecha robot. Kawamori came up with the idea of transforming mechs while working on the Diaclone and Macross franchises in the early 1980s (such as the VF-1 Valkyrie in Macross and Robotech), with his Diaclone mechs later providing the basis for Transformers. Some of Kawamori's most iconic transforming mecha designs include the VF-1 Valkyrie from the Macross and Robotech franchises, and Optimus Prime (called Convoy in Japan) from the Transformers and Diaclone franchises.

In 2001, he brought his mecha design talent to real-life projects when he designed a variant of the Sony AIBO robotic dog, the ERS-220.

Legacy
Kawamori came up with several innovative concepts and helped create several franchises which had a significant impact on popular culture, both in Japan and internationally. One of his original ideas was the transforming mecha, which can transform between a standard vehicle (such as a fighter plane or transport truck) and a fighting mecha robot. He introduced the concept with Diaclone in 1980 and Macross in 1982, with some of his most iconic transforming mecha including the VF-1 Valkyrie from Macross (later adapted into Robotech in 1985) and Convoy from the 1983 Diaclone line (later called Optimus Prime in Transformers). The concept later became more popular in the mid-1980s, with Macross: Do You Remember Love? (1984) and Zeta Gundam (1985) in Japan, and with Robotech (1985 adaptation of Macross) and Transformers (1986 adaptation of Diaclone) in the West. In turn, Macross and Zeta Gundam became influential in Japan, while Robotech and Transformers became influential in the West, with Robotech helping to introduce anime to North America and Transformers influencing the Hollywood movie industry.

In addition to his innovative mecha design work, Kawamori also came up with innovative concepts in his character writing. In contrast to earlier mecha anime which focused on combatants, he wanted to portray a mecha conflict from the perspective of non-combatant civilians, which led to his creation of the fictional singer Lynn Minmay in Macross. She went on to become the first virtual idol. Voiced by Mari Iijima, Minmay was the first fictional idol singer to garner major real-world success, with the theme song "Do You Remember Love?" (from the film Macross: Do You Remember Love?) reaching number seven on the Oricon music charts in Japan. Kawamori later took the concept further in Macross Plus (1994) with the virtual idol Sharon Apple, an artificial intelligence (AI) computer program who takes the form of an intergalactic pop star. The same year, he created Macross 7 (1994), which featured the virtual band Fire Bomber who became a commercial success and spawned multiple CDs released in Japan. The Macross franchise set the template for later virtual idols in the early 21st century, such as Hatsune Miku and Kizuna AI.

Another innovative character concept he came up with was the role of Misa Hayase in Macross (called Lisa Hayes in Robotech), who was one of the main commanders of the Macross battleship. She was the boss and commanding officer of the fighter pilot protagonist Hikaru Ichijyo (called Rick Hunter in Robotech), and later his love interest. This was a scenario Kawamori came up with which he had not seen in any Hollywood movies before. A similar scenario, however, later appeared in the Hollywood movie Top Gun (1986). According to Kawamori, "Many people pointed out that later films like Top Gun copied that idea and setting, as well as including the combination of many songs and fighters too."

Works

Anime

Macross series
The Super Dimension Fortress Macross - Original Series Concept Creator, Production Supervisor, Mechanical Designer
Macross: Do You Remember Love? - Movie Concept Creator, Director, Mechanical Designer, Series Script Supervisor, Movie Story
The Super Dimension Fortress Macross: Flash Back 2012 - Executive Director, Compilation, Mechanical Designer
Macross Plus - Creator, Executive Director, Writer, Mechanical Design
Macross 7 - Creator, Writer, Supervisor, Mechanical Designer
Macross Dynamite 7 - Creator, Series Script Supervisor, Mechanical Designer, Ending Photography
Macross Zero - Creator, Director, Writer, Mechanical Designer
Macross Frontier - Creator, Supervising Director, Story Composition, Mechanical Designer
Macross FB 7: Ore no Uta o Kike! - Original Creator, Valkyrie Design
Macross Delta - Creator, Main Director, Writer, Valkyrie Mechanical Designer

Note: Macross II is the only animated Macross project in which Kawamori had no involvement.Other animeSpace Battleship Yamato series - Spaceship Mechanical Design (Uncredited)Future GPX Cyber Formula - Machine DesignFuture GPX Cyber Formula SIN - Machine DesignThe Vision of Escaflowne - Original Creator, Series Script SupervisorSpring and Chaos - Director, ScreenplayEarth Maiden Arjuna - Original Creator, Director, Series Script SupervisorThe Family's Defensive Alliance - Original Creator, Series PlannerGenesis of Aquarion - Original Creator, Director, Series Script Supervisor, Aquarion DesignGenesis of Aquarion (OVA) - Director, Series Composition, Original CreatorAquarion Evol - Original Creator, Director, Series Script Supervisor, Aquarion DesignPatlabor: The Movie - Mechanical Design (Credited as Masaharu Kawamori)Patlabor 2: The Movie - Mechanical Design (Credited as Masaharu Kawamori)WXIII: Patlabor the Movie 3 - Mechanical Design
Eureka Seven - Main Mechanic Design
Eureka Seven: AO - Nirvash Design
Engage Planet Kiss Dum - Main Mechanical Design
Kishin Taisen Gigantic Formula - Mechanical designer (Junova-VIII)
Mobile Suit Gundam 0083: Stardust Memory - Designed the RX-78GP01 "Zephyranthes" and the RX-78GP02A "Physalis" Gundams
Ulysses 31 - Mechanical Design
Dangaioh - Mechanical Design, key animation
Ghost in the Shell - Mechanical Design
Basquash! - Original Concept, Project Director
Outlaw Star - Designed the ship XGP15A-II
Tōshō Daimos - Guest Mechanical Designer
Gordian Warrior - Guest Mechanical Designer
Golden Warrior Gold Lightan - Guest Mechanical Designer
Anyamaru Tantei Kiruminzuu - Original Creator
AKB0048 - Original Creator, Director, Mechanical Design
Ani*Kuri15 - Director (ep. 4)
Robotech - Adapted from Macross
Cowboy Bebop - Script (ep. 18), Stage Setting Cooperation
Glass Fleet - Mechanical Design
M3: Sono Kuroki Hagane - Mechanical Design
Nobunaga the Fool - Original Creator
Last Hope - Original Creator, Director
Noein - Storyboard (ep. 20)
RahXephon - Storyboard (ep. 9)
Techno Police 21C - Action Choreography Assistance and Mechanical Design
The Ultraman - Mechanical Design

Video games
Ace Combat Assault Horizon - Guest Designer
Armored Core - Mechanic Designer
Armored Core: Project Phantasma - Mechanic Designer
Armored Core: Master of Arena - Mechanic Designer
Armored Core 2 - Mechanic Concept Designer
Armored Core 2: Another Age - Mechanic Concept Designer
Armored Core 3 - Mechanic Concept Designer
Silent Line: Armored Core - Guest Designer
Armored Core: Nexus - Mechanic Concept Designer
Armored Core: For Answer - Mechanic Concept Designer
Eureka Seven vol. 1: The New Wave - Main Mechanical Designer
Eureka Seven vol. 2: The New Vision - Main Mechanical Designer
MechWarrior 3050 - Cover Art (Japanese Version)
Omega Boost - Mechanical Design Advisor, Supervisor, Mechanical/Costume Designer, Opening/Ending Movie Director
Tech Romancer - Mechanical Design, Original Concept
Macross 30: The Voice that Connects the Galaxy - Supervisor, Mechanical Designer, Animated Sequences Director
Daemon X Machina - Mechanic Designer
Devil May Cry 5 - Designed the robotic arms, "Devil Breakers", found throughout the game. Gerbera GP01 was designed with Shoji Kawamori's past works in mind as inspiration. "Devil Breaker"
Call of Duty: Mobile - Designed the Reaper skin, titled "Ashura".
• Super Mecha Champions — Designed Playable Mecha "Pulsar"

Other work
Diaclone (1980-1982, toyline) - Mecha design
Transformers (1984, 2006, toyline) - Adapted from Diaclone, mecha design
Gunhed (1989, live action film) - Mechanical Design
The Vision of Escaflowne (1994, manga) - Writer
Thunderbirds Are Go (2015, animated TV series) - Mechanical Design

References

External links
Official site: Japanese, English
Shoji Kawamori Official site (Satelight)

Shoji Kawamori at the Macross Compendium
Shoji Kawamori entry at Gears Online

1960 births
Anime directors
Anime screenwriters
Mechanical designers (mecha)
Macross
Living people
Satelight
Sunrise (company) people
Toy inventors